Mle'a (lit. whole yield) is a moshav in northern Israel. Located in the Ta'anakh region, it falls under the jurisdiction of Gilboa Regional Council.

History
It was founded in 1956 by Jewish immigrants and refugees to Israel from Morocco in the program to settle the Ta'anakh region. However, by the end of 1957 most of the original settlers moved out, with Jewish immigrants from Poland moving in to replace them. Most residents make a living from agriculture and raising livestock.

The name Mle'a relates to agriculture and is taken from the Bible: "lest the whole yield of the seed and of the fruit is forfeited to the sanctuary." (Deuteronomy 22:9)

References

Moshavim
Populated places in Northern District (Israel)
Populated places established in 1956
1956 establishments in Israel
Moroccan-Jewish culture in Israel
Polish-Jewish culture in Israel